Oddur Golf Club is a golf club and course in Garðabær, Iceland.

Oddur Golf Club was established in 1990 as a nine-hole course and was designed by Hannes Thorsteinsson. It was expanded to an 18-hole course in 1997.

The club consists of two courses:  Urrioðavöllur, the 18-hole course, and Ljúflinger, the 9-hole par 3 course.

Tournaments
The club hosted the 2006 Icelandic Golf Championship and the 2016 European Ladies' Amateur Team Championship.

External links
Oddur Golf Club Website

References

Golf clubs and courses in Iceland
1990 establishments in Iceland